Nekabborer Mohaproyan is a 2014 Bangladeshi film directed and produced by Masud Pathik. The screenplay is based on the poetry of Nirmalendu Goon. It earned six Bangladesh National Film Awards including the Best Film. The film received financial aid from the government.

Cast
Prabir Mitra
Shimla
Mamunur Rashid
Affan Mitul

Awards

Bangladesh National Film Awards
 Best Film
 Best Female Playback Singer
 Best Songwriter
 Best Music Composer
 Best Lyricist
 Best Makeup Man

References

External links
 

2014 films
Bengali-language Bangladeshi films
Films based on the Bangladesh Liberation War
2010s Bengali-language films
Films scored by Sayeem Rana
Best Film National Film Award (Bangladesh) winners
Government of Bangladesh grants films